Obegu is a rural autonomous community located in Ugwunagbo local government area of Abia State south-eastern Nigeria. Its postal code is 453120.

Notable people
 Emeka Ananaba, former Deputy Governor of Abia State
 Nathan Kanu — Nigerian priest

References

Populated places in Abia State